South West Coach Lines is a bus and coach operator in South West Western Australia. It is a subsidiary of the Australian Transit Group.

History
South West Coach Lines was founded in 1977 by David and Lenita Adams. In January 1986, it commenced operating the Bunbury City Transit service (since renamed TransBunbury). In November 2007 the business was purchased by Veolia Transport and in July 2013 became part of Transdev Australasia.
It operates express coach services, school services and bus charters.

In December 2009, South West Coach Lines commenced operating three services in Busselton under the TransBusselton brand under contract to the Public Transport Authority. Upon being re-tendered, the routes passed to Swan Transit from 1 January 2015.

South West Coach Lines operate 14 school services and express coach services connecting Perth with various destinations in South West Western Australia.

South West Coach lines is now owned and operated by Australian Transit Group.

Fleet
As at September 2013, the TransBusselton fleet consists of 22 buses. As at May 2014, the South West Coach Lines fleet consists of 42 buses and coaches.

References

External links
South West Coach Lines

Bus companies of Western Australia
South West (Western Australia)
Transport companies established in 1977
Transdev
Australian companies established in 1977